After the Ball is a 1924 American silent drama film directed by Dallas M. Fitzgerald and starring Gaston Glass, Miriam Cooper, and Edna Murphy.

Plot
As described in a film magazine review, Arthur Trevelyan, the dissolute son of Mark Trevelyan, is put out of his home when he marries a young woman of whom his father disapproves. Through the press of circumstances, Arthur is forced to exchange clothes with a crook, who is later shot. The newspapers report that it is Arthur who was killed, and the real Arthur is jailed for the crime. After some time he escapes and finds that he is the father of a five year old child. The real culprit confesses to the crime, and Arthur is exonerated.

Cast

References

Bibliography
 Munden, Kenneth White. The American Film Institute Catalog of Motion Pictures Produced in the United States, Part 1. University of California Press, 1997.

External links

1924 films
1924 drama films
1920s English-language films
American silent feature films
Silent American drama films
Films directed by Dallas M. Fitzgerald
American black-and-white films
Film Booking Offices of America films
1920s American films